Dario Martinelli (born Andria, Italy, March 1, 1974) is an Italian semiotician, musicologist and composer.

He is director of the International Semiotics Institute, professor at Kaunas University of Technology, and is also affiliated to the University of Helsinki and the University of Lapland (adjunct professor in both cases). His visiting professorships include the University of Torino (2015–2016), the Lithuanian Academy of Music and Theatre (2012–2014), the Finnish Network University of Semiotics (2004–2007) and the Fine Arts Academy of Bari (2005–2006).

Martinelli graduated at Bologna University in 1999 and earned his PhD at Helsinki University in 2002.

He performs research and publishes monographs and articles in the fields of musicology, popular music studies, film studies, semiotics, animal studies (he is possibly best known for his work in zoomusicology and zoosemiotics) and a research platform called "numanities", devoted to the rethinking of the role and paradigm of the humanities in modern society.

An editor of the Springer book series Numanities - Arts and Humanities in Progress, Martinelli is also a member of several editorial and scientific boards in journals, doctoral committees and academic associations.

In 2006, Martinelli was knighted by the Italian Republic for his contribution to Italian culture. He is also the youngest winner of the Oscar Parland Prize for Prominent Semioticians, awarded by Helsinki University (2004).

Honors 
 Knight of the Order of the Star of Italy – June 1, 2006

References

External links
Dario Martinelli's homepage
The International Semiotics Institute

Italian composers
Italian male composers
Lithuanian semioticians
Italian semioticians
Zoomusicology
1974 births
Living people